Badr El Kaddouri (born 31 January 1981) is a retired Moroccan footballer, who last played for Ukrainian Premier League side Dynamo Kyiv. He was also a Moroccan international. El Kaddouri was a left back but could also play left midfield if needed.

Career

Wydad Casablanca
El Kaddouri started his career at Wydad Casablanca in 2000. In 2001, he helped the club win the Moroccan Cup. The following season, he joined Dynamo Kyiv.

Dynamo Kyiv
El Kaddouri joined Dynamo Kyiv in 2002 and, up until his loan move to Celtic in 2011, was one of the longest serving players at the club. He made his debut with Dynamo on 17 August 2002 in a 3–1 victory over Volyn Lutsk. While at the club, he won four Ukrainian Premier League titles, four Ukrainian Cup's and five Ukrainian Super Cups. He appeared in 123 league matches while occasionally captaining the team.

Celtic
On 31 August 2011, El Kaddouri signed for Scottish Premier League club Celtic on a six-month loan deal with an option to buy. He was the first ever Moroccan to play for Celtic. He was brought in as cover for Emilio Izaguirre, who had received a long-term injury. On 10 September 2011, El Kaddouri made his Celtic debut in a 4–0 over Motherwell. He scored his first goal for Celtic in the Old Firm derby match against Rangers on 18 September 2011 and made 6 appearances for the Scottish side before returning to Dynamo Kyiv in January 2012.

International career
El Kaddouri had a total of 45 appearances for his country and was a regular in the national side. He also competed at the 2004 Summer Olympics with the Moroccan Olympic team.

Honours

Club
Wydad Casablanca
Coupe du Trône (1): 2001
Dynamo Kyiv
 Ukrainian Premier League (4): 2003, 2004, 2007, 2009
 Ukrainian Cup (4): 2003, 2005, 2006, 2007
 Ukrainian Super Cup (5): 2004, 2006, 2007, 2009, 2011

References

External links

 

1981 births
Living people
Moroccan footballers
Footballers from Casablanca
Morocco international footballers
Moroccan expatriate footballers
Wydad AC players
FC Dynamo Kyiv players
Celtic F.C. players
Olympic footballers of Morocco
Footballers at the 2004 Summer Olympics
2002 African Cup of Nations players
2006 Africa Cup of Nations players
2008 Africa Cup of Nations players
2012 Africa Cup of Nations players
Ukrainian Premier League players
Scottish Premier League players
Expatriate footballers in Ukraine
Expatriate footballers in Scotland
Moroccan expatriate sportspeople in Ukraine
Moroccan expatriate sportspeople in Scotland
Association football defenders